Dylan Michael Inserra (born 22 May 1987)
is a retired acrobatic gymnast and rugby union player.

Early life

Inserra was born in Dallas, Texas, the son of Stephanie Rose (née Parks) and Tony Michael Inserra. He has an older sister; Jennifer. He grew up in Richardson, Texas where he went to Richardson High School and studied clinical mental health counseling at Southern New Hampshire University.

Career

2008-2010: Acrobatic Gymnastics

Inserra competed as a senior elite men's pair with his partner, top Axl Osborne. Inserra, the older of the two, was the base of the pair. Inserra and Osborne trained at World Olympic Gymnastics Academy in Plano, Texas, which was also the training center for Nastia Liukin, winner of the women's gymnastics all-around title at the 2008 Beijing Olympics, and Carly Patterson, winner of the women's gymnastics all-around title at the 2004 Summer Olympics in Athens, Greece.

In November 2008, Inserra and Osborne qualified for elite status during a competition at the Karolyi Ranch in New Waverly, Texas.

The next year, Inserra and Osborne captured the senior national men's pair title at the 2009 Acrobatic Gymnastics Championships in Dallas, Texas, and they were named to the U.S. senior national team.

In the summer of 2010 in Kissimmee, Florida, Osborne and Inserra repeated as national men's pair champions, placing first in both dynamic and balance events. They were once again named to the U.S. senior national team.

Internationally, the pair competed at the 2010 World Championships in Wroclaw, Poland, where they placed seventh, and at the 2010 Volkov Cup in Novgorod, Russia, where they placed fourth.

The pair disbanded after the 2010 season.

2010-Present: Rugby Union

In 2016, Inserra became a member of the Dallas Lost Souls, a men's rugby union football club founded in 2012 that competes in the Mark Kendall Bingham Memorial Tournament. The team participated in the 2016 Bingham Cup located in Nashville, Tennessee and the 2018 Bingham Cup in Amsterdam, where the team won the Challenger Cup and the Hoagland Cup, respectively.

Personal life
Inserra is openly queer and recently came out as demisexual. He is also an advocate for mental health awareness, and is open about his anxiety.

References

1987 births
Living people
American acrobatic gymnasts
People from Richardson, Texas
Male acrobatic gymnasts
21st-century American people
Demisexual people